Andy McDermott (born 2 July 1974) is a British thriller author and former magazine editor, film critic, and journalist. He is best known for his Nina Wilde and Eddie Chase novels.

History

Andy McDermott was born in Halifax, England on 2 July 1974. He graduated from Keele University in Staffordshire and currently lives in Bournemouth, where he works as a full-time writer. Before becoming an author he was a journalist and editor of magazines such as Hotdog Magazine and DVD Review; he has also worked as a cartoonist, graphic designer, and videogame reviewer, and has written for the award-winning British sci-fi comic 2000AD.

Netflix has bought the rights to the Nina Wilde and Eddie Chase franchise. Matt Reeves will be producing a cinematic adaptation of the first book The Hunt for Atlantis. No news since then.

Books

Nina Wilde/Eddie Chase
 2007 The Hunt for Atlantis
 2008 The Tomb of Hercules
 2008 The Secret of Excalibur
 2009 The Covenant of Genesis
 2009 The Cult of Osiris (US/Canada title: The Pyramid of Doom)
 2010 The Sacred Vault (India Title: The Vault of Shiva)
 2011 Empire of Gold
 2012 Temple of the Gods (US/Canada title: Return to Atlantis)
 2013 The Valhalla Prophecy
 2014 Kingdom of Darkness
 2015 The Last Survivor (Short Story)
 2015 The Revelation Code
 2016 The Midas Legacy
 2017 King Solomon's Curse
 2018 The Spear of Atlantis
 2019 The Resurrection Key
 2022 The Temple of Skulls

Alex Reeve
 2020 Operative 66
 2021 Rogue Assett

Others
 2006 Final Destination: Death of the Senses
 2013 The Persona Protocol, published in the US & Canada as The Shadow Protocol

Reception
Critical reception for McDermott's work has been mixed to positive. Publishers Weekly praised Hunt for Atlantis and The Covenant of Genesis.

References

External links 

 Official site

1974 births
Living people
Alumni of Keele University
English thriller writers
People from Halifax, West Yorkshire